Calum Edward Hill (born 3 November 1994) is a Scottish professional golfer who plays on the European Tour. He won the 2021 Cazoo Classic on the European Tour and has three wins on the Challenge Tour.

Amateur career
Hill attended the Western New Mexico University in Silver City, New Mexico from 2012 to 2016. In May 2016, he played in the NCAA Division II Men's Golf Championships, finishing runner-up in the individual competition. After graduating with a degree in accounting he stayed on for a further two years, completing a Masters in Business Administration (MBA). During this period he was an assistant golf coach for the university team. He turned professional in April 2017.

Professional career
Hill played a limited number of events while studying for his MBA. In 2017 he won the San Juan Open and the Arizona Open. In 2018 he came through sectional qualifying to qualify for the U.S. Open. He made the cut and finished in 61st place.

From mid-2018, Hill played on the Challenge Tour, making his debut at the Le Vaudreuil Golf Challenge in July. In August, making just his 5th start on the tour, he won the Galgorm Resort & Spa Northern Ireland Open beating Scott Henry and Stuart Manley by a stroke. Henry had seemed the likely winner but dropped four shots on the last three holes. Hill had earlier made four birdies in the final five holes, making a last round 64. He had three other top-10 finishes and ended the season 35th in the Order of Merit.

In July 2019, Hill played in the Aberdeen Standard Investments Scottish Open on the European Tour, finishing tied for 26th place. The following week he had his second Challenge Tour success, winning the Euram Bank Open by four strokes and then won the Made in Denmark Challenge in August. He finished the season in second place in the Challenge Tour Order of Merit to gain a place on the European Tour for 2020. In 2020, his first season on the European Tour, Hill finished 101st in the Order of Merit with two top-10 finishes.

In August 2021, Hill won his first European Tour event at the Cazoo Classic. He shot a final-round 67 to finish one shot ahead of Alexander Lévy. The win moved him into the top 100 of the World Rankings for the first time.

Amateur wins
2016 St. Edward's Invitational, RMAC Spring Championship

Professional wins (6)

European Tour wins (1)

Challenge Tour wins (3)

Other wins (2)

Results in major championships

Team appearances
Amateur
European Boys' Team Championship (representing Scotland): 2013

See also
2019 Challenge Tour graduates

References

External links

Scottish male golfers
European Tour golfers
Western New Mexico Mustangs
Sportspeople from Kirkcaldy
1994 births
Living people